Shat may refer to:

 Al-Shat
 Al-Shat S.C., a Libyan football club
 Shat River, a river in Russia; see Novomoskovsk, Russia
 -shat (suffix), a suffix found in Armenian toponymy
 Defence Historical Service, the French military archives formerly known as the 
 Šėta, a town in Lithuania
 Skelmanthorpe, a town in Northern England

See also
 Shats (disambiguation)